Frances Thompson may refer to:
Frances Thompson (died 1876), transgender former slave and anti-rape activist
Frances Thompson, fictional character in 1993 TV drama Family of Strangers
Frances Euphemia Thompson (1896–1992), African American artist and art educator
Frances McBroom Thompson (1942–2014), American mathematician
Mary Frances Thompson (1895–1995), native American storyteller
Frances Willson Thompson, namesake of a library at the University of Michigan–Flint

See also
Francis Thompson (disambiguation)